Unión Sport Club (usually called Unión) was a professional football club. The club has won seven First Division titles in the amateur era. The club was based in Caracas.

Honours
Primera División Venezolana: 7
Winners (7): 1932, 1934, 1935, 1939, 1940, 1947, 1950
Runner-up (3): 1929, 1930, 1948

External links
Unión SC 

Football clubs in Venezuela
Football clubs in Caracas
1925 establishments in Venezuela
Association football clubs established in 1925